St. John's Lodge may refer to:

In architecture:

 St John's Lodge, London, a Grade II* listed house in Regents Park, London

Two titles in the Baronetage of the United Kingdom:

 The Goldsmid baronets, of St John's Lodge in the County of Surrey
 The Cuyler baronets, of St John's Lodge in Welwyn in the County of Hertford

One of hundreds of Masonic lodges by that name, including:

 St. John's Lodge (New York), who possess the George Washington Inaugural Bible
 St. John's Lodge (Boston), the oldest lodge of the Grand Lodge of Massachusetts, founded in 1733
 St. John's Provincial Grand Lodge, the forerunner of the Grand Lodge of Massachusetts
 St. John's Lodge, Portsmouth, New Hampshire, which claims to be the oldest operating lodge in the Americas
 St. John's Lodge (Newport), the oldest lodge in Rhode Island
 St. John's AF & AM Lodge, also known as Tyler Masonic Lodge in Tyler, Texas
 St. John's No. 1 Lodge, more commonly known as the Tun Tavern Lodge in Philadelphia, with the oldest Masonic document in America